The 1903 East Florida Seminary football team represented the East Florida Seminary in Gainesville, Florida in the sport of American football during the 1903 college football season. This was not the modern Florida Gators of the University of Florida, which began in 1906, but one of its four predecessor institutions. The team split two games with the University of Florida at Lake City, defeated in-state rivals Florida State College and Stetson by identical scores of 16 to 0, then wrapped up the campaign with a tie and a loss to an amateur squad from Tampa.

Seminary player-coach Robert Kennedy reportedly left town with $91 in gate receipts after the contest in Tampa on Christmas Day, leaving the rest of the team scrambling to pay their hotel bill. The controversy was rectified in time for the teams' rematch on New Years Day, in which Kennedy was again Seminary's starting quarterback.

Schedule

References

East Florida Seminary
East Florida Seminary football seasons
East Florida Seminary football